Terror Among Us is a 1981 made-for-television action crime film directed by Paul Krasny and starring Don Meredith, Sarah Purcell, and Jennifer Salt. It first aired January 14, 1981.  The script was co-written by Dallas and JoAnne Barnes.

Plot
A police sergeant and a parole officer endeavor to stop a rapist-on-parole before he can follow through his threats on five women who testified against him years earlier.

Cast 
Don Meredith as Sergeant Tom Stockwell
Sarah Purcell as Jennifer
Jennifer Salt as Connie Paxton
Kim Lankford as Vickie Stevens
Sharon Spelman as Sara Kates
Rod McCary as Gates
Elta Blake as Beth
Pat Klous as Cathy
Jim Antonio as Doctor
Virginia Paris as Mrs. Quinn
Tracy Reed as Barbara
Ted Shackelford as Delbert Ramsey
Stephen Keep as Roger Shiel

References

External links

1981 horror films
American horror television films
1981 television films
1981 films
Films directed by Paul Krasny
1980s English-language films
1980s American films